Anna Yolanda Harris (born 15 October 1998) is an English cricket umpire and cricketer.

Harris began umpiring top-level cricket in 2020, and umpired her first international match in 2021. She has also played domestic cricket for Wales, Buckinghamshire and Berkshire.

Personal life
Harris is currently studying medicine at Cardiff University, as well as serving as a healthcare support worker, including treating patients who are diagnosed with COVID-19.

Career
She pursued her interest in the sport of cricket from when she was just five years old. She was inspired to take up the sport by one of her teachers who brought cricket kit out in order to entertain the students during a rainy day at her primary school. She soon urged her mother Yolanda to sign her up in order to play for a local club. She was later encouraged to pursue an umpiring course by her mother, who was also an umpire by profession.

In May 2021, she, alongside Yvonne Dolphin-Cooper, created history by becoming the first-all female umpiring duo ever in ECB Premier League history when they officiated together in a West of England Premier League match between Downend CC and Bedminster in Gloucestershire.

She officiated as one of the umpires in the inaugural edition of the Rachael Heyhoe Flint Trophy in 2020. She was also chosen to officiate in the 2021 Rachael Heyhoe Flint Trophy. She has also served as an umpire in the South Wales Premier League, the Thames Valley League, and completed a season in Melbourne. She also officiated in few matches of the inaugural edition of The Hundred in 2021.

She became the youngest ever umpire to officiate in an international cricket match at the age of 22 during the bilateral women's ODI series between England and New Zealand in September 2021.

References

External links 

1998 births
Living people
Buckinghamshire women cricketers
Berkshire women cricketers
Wales women cricketers
English cricket umpires
Women cricket umpires
English women referees and umpires
People from High Wycombe